In Greek mythology, Agenor (Ancient Greek: Ἀγήνωρ or Αγήνορι Agēnor; English translation: 'heroic, manly') was a Trojan hero.

Family 
Agenor was the son of Antenor and Theano, daughter of King Cisseus of Thrace. His siblings were Crino, Acamas, Antheus, Archelochus, Coön, Demoleon, Eurymachus, Glaucus, Helicaon, Iphidamas, Laodamas, Laodocus, Medon, Polybus,  and Thersilochus

Mythology 
When Achilles was routing the entire Trojan army, Agenor was the first Trojan to collect his wits and stop fleeing from Achilles' rampage.  Agenor felt ashamed that he was fleeing from a man who was supposedly just as mortal as anyone so he turned to face Achilles.  As the Greek hero approached Agenor the latter threw his spear at him, but only hit Achilles' greaves.  After that Achilles sprang at Agenor, but at that moment Apollo carried the Trojan away in a veil of mist to keep Achilles from pursuing him, while Apollo took the form of Agenor to lead Achilles away from the Trojans. This act allowed all the Trojans (except Hector) to take cover behind the walls of Troy.

Agenor killed two people in the war. His son Echeclus was killed by Achilles.

According to Pausanias, Agenor was killed by Achilles' son Neoptolemus when the Achaeans were storming Troy through the Trojan Horse ruse.

Agenor's picture appears in the great painting in the Lesche of Delphi, by Polygnotus.

Notes

References 

 Apollodorus, The Library with an English Translation by Sir James George Frazer, F.B.A., F.R.S. in 2 Volumes, Cambridge, MA, Harvard University Press; London, William Heinemann Ltd. 1921. ISBN 0-674-99135-4. Online version at the Perseus Digital Library. Greek text available from the same website.
 Dictys Cretensis, from The Trojan War. The Chronicles of Dictys of Crete and Dares the Phrygian translated by Richard McIlwaine Frazer, Jr. (1931-). Indiana University Press. 1966. Online version at the Topos Text Project.
 Homer, The Iliad with an English Translation by A.T. Murray, Ph.D. in two volumes. Cambridge, MA., Harvard University Press; London, William Heinemann, Ltd. 1924. . Online version at the Perseus Digital Library.
 Homer, Homeri Opera in five volumes. Oxford, Oxford University Press. 1920. . Greek text available at the Perseus Digital Library.
 Hyginus, Fabulae from The Myths of Hyginus translated and edited by Mary Grant. University of Kansas Publications in Humanistic Studies. Online version at the Topos Text Project.
 Pausanias, Description of Greece with an English Translation by W.H.S. Jones, Litt.D., and H.A. Ormerod, M.A., in 4 Volumes. Cambridge, MA, Harvard University Press; London, William Heinemann Ltd. 1918. . Online version at the Perseus Digital Library
 Pausanias, Graeciae Descriptio. 3 vols. Leipzig, Teubner. 1903.  Greek text available at the Perseus Digital Library.
 Publius Vergilius Maro, Aeneid. Theodore C. Williams. trans. Boston. Houghton Mifflin Co. 1910. Online version at the Perseus Digital Library.
 Publius Vergilius Maro, Bucolics, Aeneid, and Georgics. J. B. Greenough. Boston. Ginn & Co. 1900. Latin text available at the Perseus Digital Library.
 Tzetzes, John, Allegories of the Iliad translated by Goldwyn, Adam J. and Kokkini, Dimitra. Dumbarton Oaks Medieval Library, Harvard University Press, 2015.

Trojans
People of the Trojan War